Shanta Gaury Pathak (née Pandit; 2 February 1927 – 23 November 2010) was a British businesswoman of Indo-Ugandan descent, and the co-founder, alongside her husband Laxmishanker Pathak, of the Patak's brand of Indian-style curry pastes, sauces and spices.

Early life
Pathak was born Shanta Gaury Pathak Pandit to Gujarati parents in Zanzibar, Tanganyika, on 2 February 1927.  In 1945, she married Laxmishanker Pathak, who in 1938 had emigrated from Gujarat in British India to Mombasa, Kenya, where his eldest brother had a small business making sweets and samosas for the city's burgeoning Indian population. 

With the onset of the Mau Mau Uprising, and increasing hostility, the Pathaks set sail on the passenger  ship SS Uganda, stopping in Kenya and Marseilles, to England in 1956, reaching London with just £5.

Career

Unhappy about her husband's job cleaning the drains for St Pancras Council, Pathak decided the family should start a similar business to that they had in Kenya, running a kitchen from their Queen's Crescent flat in Kentish Town. 

Progress was slow, and it was several years until they had enough money to buy a small shop close to Euston Station, followed by another in 1961, in Bayswater.

In 1962, their neighbours complained about the noise and smell, and the Council gave them three months to find alternative premises. They found a converted mill in Brackley, Northamptonshire, and left London. Later, they relocated to Lancashire.

Over time, the business grew to have an annual turnover of £55 million, and in 2007 was taken over by Associated British Foods for a sum estimated to be between £100- and £200 million.

Personal life
They had four sons and two daughters. Her husband died in 1997, but the will he left was unclear, and there were long-running family disputes and various acrimonious court cases.

Later life
Pathak died of heart failure on 23 November 2010, at the Royal Bolton Hospital, Farnworth, Bolton, and was survived by her six children.

References

1927 births
2010 deaths
British women business executives
British businesspeople of Indian descent
Zanzibari people of Indian descent
British company founders
People from Greater Manchester